Pag triangle is a pareidolia and land formation in the shape of an irregular quadrilateral located near village Kustići, adjacent to Novalja on the Croatian island Pag. It has been made a designated a natural landmark by Town of Novalja.

Formation has been noted on 9th of May 1999 by Zdenko Grbavac, surveyor taking measurements for a quarry.

In ten years since its discovery, media sensationalism turned it into an urban myth and claims have been made of over 500,000 tourist visitors.

Croatian ufologists have linked the existence of the formation to a series of UFO sightings in late 20th century over the island of Pag.

In early 2009, a road was built connecting the triangle to the nearby village Caska and thus making it more accessible to visitors. Many visitors have taken rocks as souvenirs or charms due to unsubstantiated claims about their healing powers, which has left the area with holes. Others have repositioned some rocks, creating petroforms.

The formation, which is not even a triangle, is one of many polygonal shapes on the broken karst terrain. It has no scientifically proven geological or geochemical differences compared to the rest of the area.

References 

Earth mysteries
Geography of Zadar County
Paranormal triangles
Pag (island)